local.604 is a 2002 album by Canadian hip hop group Sweatshop Union. It is a re-issue of the band's first independent release with some changes.

The track titled "Audio Cassette Therapy" was cut from the album.

Two tracks, "The Human's Race" and "President's Choice", were added in this re-issue.

A bunch of different tracks were re-recorded, including different vocal takes, and changes in instruments.

Track listing
All tracks were written by Sweatshop Union, except where noted.
 "Nothing Makes Sense" (DertMerchant) – 2:32
 "Union Dues" – 3:09
 "Feelin' Alright" (Kyprios) – 3:15
 "The Humans' Race" – 4:14
 "President's Choice" (Creative Minds) – 3:32
 "Don't Mind Us" (Innocent Bystanders) – 3:34
 "Blue Collar Ballad" (Dirty Circus) – 3:50
 "All I Know" (Kyprios) – 3:33
 "Dirty Work" – 5:31
 "The Truth We Speak" (Dirty Circus) – 3:22
 "Little Things" (Creative Minds) – 3:51
 "Prose and Cons" (Dirty Circus featuring Bookworm and J-StaRRRrrr!!!) – 4:09
 "A Wrinkle in Time" (Innocent Bystanders) – 2:53
 "Breath" (Creative Minds) – 2:35
 "Labour Pains" – 4:16
 "The Revolution" (Kyprios) – 5:04
 "Ascend" (Innocent Bystanders) – 4:42
 "Outro" – 9:07

2002 albums
Sweatshop Union albums
Reissue albums